101-in-1 Sports Party Megamix is a video game developed by Nordcurrent and published by Atlus for the Wii and Nintendo DS. It was first released in Europe on November 19, 2010 and in North America on January 13, 2011.

Gameplay
Players move the Wii Remote in games such as bowling, motorcross, and racing. Two to four players can compete against each other in a sack race, tennis, and skateboarding. Gamers who set high scores can unlock other games to play.

Reception
Upon release, Sports Party Megamix earned mostly negative reviews. Metacritic gave the game a 41/100 based on 7 reviews. The game was also criticized for sloppy graphics, and unresponsive controls.

References

External links
 

2010 video games
Wii games
Wii-only games
Atlus games
Multiplayer and single-player video games
Video games developed in Lithuania
Nordcurrent games